The England national cricket team toured New Zealand in February and March 1997 and played a three-match Test series against the New Zealand national cricket team. England won the series 2–0 with one match drawn. Five ODIs, along with 4 tour matches were also played.

Test series

1st Test

2nd Test

3rd Test

ODIs series
The series was drawn 2-2, with one match tied.

1st ODI

2nd ODI

3rd ODI

4th ODI

5th ODI

See also 
 English cricket team in Zimbabwe in 1996–97 that ended weeks before this tour

References

External links
 England tour of New Zealand, 1996-97 at ESPNcricinfo

1997 in English cricket
1997 in New Zealand cricket
New Zealand cricket seasons from 1970–71 to 1999–2000
1996-97
International cricket competitions from 1994–95 to 1997